I Mean is the seventh EP of the South Korean boy group BTOB. It was released on October 12, 2015, with the lead single "Way Back Home". The EP contains 6 tracks. It features the group's strong vocal skills. This also leads to BTOB's growing success as they achieved their first music broadcast trophy through this album.

Release
In September 2015, BTOB announced their upcoming comeback with another ballad track that will be released in October. They released their album and drama-themed music video for lead single "Way Back Home" with member Ilhoon as the main actor.

Promotion
BTOB held their first music show performance on the 163rd episode of Show Champion, performing both "Heart Attack" and "Way Back Home". On some music show performances, Sungjae wasn't able to perform with the group due to drama that took place during filming. His parts were replaced by other members. They concluded their promotions on Inkigayo after a 5-week promotion.

Track listing
※ Bold track title means it is the title track in the album.

Chart performance

Music program wins

References

External links

Cube Entertainment EPs
2015 EPs
BtoB (band) EPs
Korean-language EPs